The Loch of Strathbeg (also known as Loch Strathbeg; historically "Strathbeg Water"; "Water of Strathbeg"; "Rattray Water" or "Water of Rattray") is a designated Special Protection Area for wildlife conservation purposes. It is located near to Rattray and Crimond in Aberdeenshire, Scotland.

The loch is maintained by the RSPB and around the loch there are three hides from which visitors may watch the birds and other wildlife. Access to the loch is through Crimond airfield where there is a car park at the edge of the reserve. There is also the 'Starnafin Centre' from which visitors may also watch the birds from and find out more information about which birds and animals are present locally.

The RSPB has recorded over 260 species of bird, 280 species of insect and 26 species of mammal at the reserve.

Formation 

The loch is a very recent creation of geological times, forming naturally in a massive storm in 1720. The lagoon, where the loch is now, its small harbour Starny Keppie and the village of Rattray, were cut off from the sea and engulfed by shifting sands.

A historical account says that the storm blocked "the outlet of the stream called the burn of Strathbeg into the sea" after which it flowed directly into the loch.

There is another stream, the "Burn o’ Rattra"  flowing into the loch. Ordnance Survey mapping of the Loch shows four streams ("burns" in Scots) and one exit point into the north sea.

1854 study
In 1854 the loch was estimated at "550 Scotch acres" (2.9 km² ) of which "more than three-fourths" were to be found in the Parish of Crimond and to have an "average depth is about 3½ feet" (approx. 1.1 metres) "its greatest depth does not exceed 6½ feet" (approx. 2 metres). This does not necessarily correspond with conditions today, as the same source also notes that the nearby beach head was at the time saturated and "oozing water" indeed it says that the loch had dropped at least  since 1817, only 37 years earlier.

1943
In 1943, Loch of Strathbeg was used by the Luftwaffe as an area to drop supplies to spies in the area.  The area to the North of the loch was normally the drop point.

One drop in 1943 was set up by the British to use a double agent to drop a radio, money and some sabotage equipment in a case.

1945
At the end of World War 2, there was a large beach Minefield at Rattray.  During land mine clearance, high pressure water pumps were used at the Loch of Strathbeg to provide a supply of water to jetting nozzles used to wash out land mines from the sand dunes.  This work was carried out by 11th Coy Bomb disposal led by Major W.M. Hewitt. During clearance into 1946, a number of Royal Engineer personnel were killed in the minefield.

Maps
Historical maps of the area are available online that show the transition of Strathbeg Bay into Loch Strathbeg (links are provided rather than the image for copyright reasons):

References

External links 

Official Tourism Web Site
Special Protection Area designation
RSPB webpage on Loch Strathbeg

Royal Society for the Protection of Birds reserves in Scotland
Special Protection Areas in Scotland
Protected areas of Aberdeenshire
Strachbeg
Ramsar sites in Scotland
Strathbeg